Hamile is a village in the Jirapa/Lambussie district, a district in the far northwestern Upper West Region of north Ghana, close to the border with Burkina Faso.

Transport 
In July 2007, contracts were made for the construction of a railway extension in the village of Hamile. There is a 88.5 km highway from Wa-Hamile.

Facilities 

 Hamile Border Post
 Hamile Truck Park

References

External links 
 http://www.hamile.rhade.de/ Partnership-Website with Dorsten-Rhade in Germany

Populated places in the Upper West Region